William James Piper Trevitt   (born 1969) is a British ballet dancer and choreographer.

Early life
William Trevitt was born in 1969 in Cambridge. He began dancing aged 6, and trained at the Royal Ballet School, from 11 to 16.

Career

Dancer
Trevitt joined the Royal Ballet aged 18, and was promoted to principal in 1994. In 2001, together with fellow principal dancer Michael Nunn, he left to found the modern dance group, BalletBoyz.

Choreographer
Trevitt now works as a choreographer with BalletBoyz. A 90-minute abridgment of Kenneth Macmillan's ballet Romeo and Juliet was produced by Michael Nunn and William Trevitt for BBC television and broadcast in 2020 on PBS.

Personal life
He lives with his wife Rebecca and their three sons in Kingston, Surrey.

References

British male ballet dancers
British choreographers
1969 births
Living people
Officers of the Order of the British Empire
Principal dancers of The Royal Ballet
People from Cambridge